John Kimbell (born January 3, 1969) is an American professional golfer.

Kimbell was born in Atlanta, Georgia. He did not start playing golf until the age of 22. He turned professional in 1997.

Kimbell played on mini-tours, winning three NGA Hooters Tour events and one Tight Lies Tour event. He has played on the Nationwide Tour since 2007. He has one win on Tour, the 2007 South Georgia Classic.

Professional wins (5)

Nationwide Tour wins (1)

Other wins (4)
2004 American Signature Open (NGA Hooters Tour)
2006 Langdale Ford Championship (NGA Hooters Tour)
1 other NGA Hooters Tour events
1 Tight Lies Tour event

References

External links

American male golfers
PGA Tour golfers
Golfers from Atlanta
People from LaFayette, Georgia
1969 births
Living people